Clear Creek Independent School District (CCISD) is a school district based in League City, Texas, United States. The district serves most of the Clear Lake Area and some other neighboring parts of the Houston metropolitan area. CCISD is the 29th largest school district in Texas, spanning 103 square miles and serving over 41,000 students. The district operates 45 distinct campuses, consisting of 5 comprehensive high schools, 3 alternative high schools, 10 intermediate schools, and 27 elementary schools.
The Superintendent of Schools is Karen Engle.

Clear Creek ISD currently operates two football stadiums, Veterans Memorial Stadium and Challenger Columbia Stadium, both of which serve all five of the district's 6A high schools.

History 
Clear Creek ISD was formed in 1948 when the districts of Kemah, League City, Seabrook, and Webster were consolidated, deriving its name from nearby Clear Creek, which forms Clear Lake, one of the few natural lakes in Texas. CCISD continued operating Webster High School until Clear Creek High School opened in 1956.  The district opened Clear Lake High School in 1972, Clear Brook High School in 1988, Clear Springs High School in 2008, and Clear Falls High School in 2010.

In the 2000s, rising real estate costs in Galveston forced many families to move to other areas, including League City. This meant an influx of children out of Galveston ISD and into other school districts like Clear Creek ISD.

On May 11, 2013 the district was successful in a vote securing $367 million to "...rebuild or improve 40+ year old schools; address student safety, security systems, repairs and enrollment growth; construct or expand co-curricular and extracurricular facilities for growth in programs; and improve wireless infrastructure and access to technology for 21st century learning."

On May 6, 2017 the district was successful in a vote to approve a bond with largely the same purpose stated in 2013 "...to build new or rebuild schools, replace portables with permanent additions, renovate aging schools to bring them up to today’s learning standards, improve school and bus safety through the purchase of surveillance equipment and buses."  This second bond in 2017 for $487 million resulted in a 4-year total of US$854 million of funding over and above that allocated by the state for this purpose.

CCISD is the 29th largest school district in Texas.  The total enrollment for the district is currently 42,008 students.  According to the last CCISD reported actual financials (2017-2018), the annual per student cost is over $12,000.

Eric Williams became CCISD superintendent in February 2021. By December a group of parents accused him of promoting "critical race theory" in K-12 schools. Williams had stated he would not promote CRT and he would not close campuses with incidents of COVID-19. Williams resigned in July 2022.

Clear Creek ISD cities 
CCISD includes sections of Galveston County and Harris County.

CCISD serves the following municipalities in their entirety:
 Clear Lake Shores
 El Lago
 Kemah
 Nassau Bay
 Seabrook
 Taylor Lake Village
 Webster

CCISD serves portions of the following municipalities:
 Friendswood (Harris County portion)
 Houston (Clear Lake City)
 League City (Most of League City is within CCISD)
 Pasadena
 Pearland

In addition, some unincorporated sections of Harris County and Galveston County (including a portion of Bacliff) are zoned to CCISD.

Schools

High schools 

Clear Brook High School (Unincorporated Harris County)
Clear Falls High School (League City) (Education Village)
Clear Creek High School (League City)
Clear Lake High School (Houston)
1987 National Blue Ribbon School
Clear Springs High School (League City)
Clear View High School (Webster)

Alternative schools 
Clear Horizons Early College High School (Houston)
Clear Path Alternative School (Webster)

Intermediate schools 

Bayside Intermediate School (League City) (Education Village)
Brookside Intermediate School (Friendswood)
Clear Creek Intermediate (League City)
Clear Lake Intermediate School (Houston)
1987 National Blue Ribbon School
Creekside Intermediate School (League City)
League City Intermediate School (League City)
Seabrook Intermediate School (Seabrook)
Space Center Intermediate School (Houston)
Victory Lakes Intermediate School (League City)
Westbrook Intermediate School (Friendswood)

Elementary schools 

Armand Bayou Elementary School (Houston)
Henry Bauerschlag Elementary School (League City)
Bay Elementary School (Seabrook)
2014 National Blue Ribbon School
Brookwood Elementary School (Pasadena)
Florence Campbell Elementary School (League City)
Clear Lake City Elementary School (Houston)
Falcon Pass Elementary School (Houston)
Lloyd R. Ferguson Elementary School (League City)
Darwin L. Gilmore Elementary School (League City)
Art And Pat Goforth Elementary School (League City)
P. H. Greene Elementary School (Unincorporated Harris County)
Walter Hall Elementary School (League City)
I. W. and Eleanor Hyde Elementary School (League City)
Landolt Elementary School (Unincorporated Harris County)
League City Elementary School (League City)
Margaret S. McWhirter Elementary School (Webster)
Sandra Mossman Elementary School (League City) (Education Village)
North Pointe Elementary School (Houston)
Ralph Parr Elementary School (League City)
G. W. Robinson Elementary School (Pasadena)
James H. Ross Elementary School (League City)
LaVace Stewart Elementary School (Unincorporated Galveston County)
2007 National Blue Ribbon School
2014 National Blue Ribbon School
John F. Ward Elementary School (Houston)
Arlyne and Alan Weber Elementary School (Unincorporated Harris County)
Wedgewood Elementary School (Friendswood)
G. H. Whitcomb Elementary School (Houston)
Ed White Elementary School (El Lago)

Rankings 
, Clear Creek ISD was ranked as an "exemplary" district (the highest ranking) by the Texas Education Agency. For comparison, 29% of all schools in Texas rated by the TEA were ranked as "exemplary".

Among the high schools, Clear Horizons Early College High School and Clear Lake High School (both in the Clear Lake City area of Houston) were ranked as "exemplary" with the others ranked as "recognized". On the Texas Assessment of Knowledge and Skills examinations, 97% of students passed in reading, 97% passed in writing, 98% passed in social studies, 93% passed in mathematics, and 92% passed in science.  the high school graduation rate was 97%.

See also 

List of school districts in Texas

References

External links

 

 
Pearland, Texas
School districts in Galveston County, Texas
School districts in Harris County, Texas
School districts in Houston
Education in Pasadena, Texas
Galveston Bay Area
Greater Houston
1948 establishments in Texas
School districts established in 1948